The 1876 Leitrim by-election was fought on 14 July 1876.  The byelection was fought due to the succession to a peerage of the incumbent Conservative MP, William Ormsby-Gore.  It was won by the Home Rule candidate Francis O'Beirne.

References

By-elections to the Parliament of the United Kingdom in County Leitrim constituencies
1876 elections in the United Kingdom
July 1876 events
1876 elections in Ireland